Inquisitor is a software suite used for hardware diagnostics, stress testing, certification and benchmarking platform. It is available in three formats:
 Standalone – As a package to be installed into existing Linux installation; such practice is somewhat limited in available tests.
 Live – Distributed as a Linux live CD distribution; system under test should be booted from it; this way one particular system can be tested thoroughly.
 Enterprise – A most advanced format; multiple systems can be tested simultaneously by booting from network using PXE, in fully controlled environment; all testing progress and results are collected on central server to be analyzed by testing operator.

Released under the terms of version 3 of the GNU General Public License, Inquisitor is free software.

History
Inquisitor started in early 2004 as a closed project developed by Mikhail Yakshin at ALT Linux for MaxSelect, a Russian hardware vendor. First versions were closed-source, although some effort was made to open some of its components. Versions 1 and 2 were fully developed in-house and were fully adopted by MaxSelect and its multiple branches. These versions concentrated on server-based enterprise testing and were optimized mostly for notebook hardware.

In 2005, a special abridged version of Inquisitor suite was developed for distribution on Live CDs. These Live CDs were supplied with MaxSelect products, so every buyer can stress test their newly bought hardware to ensure it runs stable.

In August, 2007, all legal complications were solved and Inquisitor was announced as an open source platform. This platform can be used to implement various Linux-based solutions that deal with hardware testing, monitoring and benchmarking. As of July, 2008, version 3.0 is released into public.

Version 3.1 made it to beta, but the distribution was discontinued before this beta was finalized.

Tests
Minimal steps that can be undertaken for purposes of testing or benchmarking are called "tests" in Inquisitor and are implemented as simple Unix shell scripts that run other (binary) programs and collects their results. In its simplest form, test outputs only binary result: success or failure, but more advanced API is supplied for benchmarks that output results.

, Inquisitor distribution includes following tests:

See also

 Phoronix Test Suite
 Stresslinux

Notes

References

 

Operating system distributions bootable from read-only media
Light-weight Linux distributions
RPM-based Linux distributions
Hardware testing
Linux distributions